Penhold is a town in central Alberta, Canada.

History 
Originally, Penhold was one of the many whistle stops along the Canadian Pacific Railway. It incorporated as the Village of Penhold in 1904.  The origin of the name "Penhold" appears to have been around the time that the railroad siding named "Penhold" was established.  Research has found no earlier instances of that name.

In 1981, the Village of Penhold incorporated as a town as a result of large population growth in the late 1970s.

RCAF Penhold 
During the second world war a Royal Canadian Air Force Station was established near the community.  The station was closed in 1994.

Demographics 

In the 2016 Census of Population conducted by Statistics Canada, the Town of Penhold recorded a population of 3,277 living in 1,235 of its 1,300 total private dwellings, a  change from its 2011 population of 2,375.

Attractions 

Attractions in Penhold include a museum, a recreation centre with an indoor arena, a baseball diamond, library, a splash park, a campground, an outdoor ice rink, and a skate park/pump track. Two more ball diamonds, walking trails, and 2 soccer fields are in development.

Education 
The town is home to three public schools of the Chinook's Edge School Division: Jessie Duncan (Pre-Kindergarten-Grade 3), Penhold Elementary (Grade 4–6), and Penhold Crossing Secondary (Grade 7–12).

See also 
List of communities in Alberta
List of towns in Alberta

References

External links 

1904 establishments in Alberta
Towns in Alberta